Silver Valley Unified School District is located in the High Desert of Southern California, between Los Angeles and Las Vegas. It provides educational services to the communities of Calico, Daggett, Fort Irwin, Ludlow, Newberry Springs and Yermo.

The district currently has two high schools, Calico Continuation High School and Silver Valley High School.

District Statistics
School Information
 Number of Schools: 7
 Number of Students: 2,596
 Number of Teachers: 144
 Number of Males: 1,214
 Number of Females: 1,213
 Area: 

Race Distribution
 Asian: 5%
 Black: 20%
 Hispanic: 20%
 Native American: 1%
 White/Other: 53%

Schools
 Alternative Education Center at 33525 Ponnay, Daggett, CA 92327, (760) 254-2715
 Fort Irwin Middle School at 1700 Pork Chop Hill St, Fort Irwin, CA 92310, (760) 386-1133
 Lewis (Congressman Jerry) Elementary School at 1800 Blackhawk St, Fort Irwin, CA 92310, (760) 386-1900
 Newberry Springs Elementary School at 33713 Newberry Rd, Newberry Springs, CA 92365, (760) 257-3211
 Silver Valley High School at 35484 Daggett/Yermo Rd, Daggett, CA 92327, (760) 254-2963
 Tiefort View Intermediate School at 8700 Anzio, Fort Irwin, CA 92310, (760) 386-3123
 Yermo Elementary School at 38280 Gleason St, Yermo, CA 92398, (760) 254-2931

References

External links
 Silver Valley Unified School District
 Silver Valley High School

School districts in San Bernardino County, California